William Hare Group Ltd is a UK headquartered structural steel contractor and the second largest, by turnover, in the country. It is family owned and has carried out projects in over fifty countries. Landmark works include structural steelwork for 20 Fenchurch Street and 201 Bishopsgate in London, and the Aldar Headquarters and Al Bahr Towers in Abu Dhabi.

William Hare Group manufactures in the UK and United Arab Emirates.

History

William Hare started his eponymous enterprise in 1888. It incorporated as William Hare Ltd in 1945, and reorganised as William Hare Group Ltd in 1998.

The firm began as a Bolton based steel erector and in 1945 diversified into steel fabrication. During the 1960s and 1970s William Hare Ltd commenced producing fabricated steel for overseas petrochemical projects, in 1977 receiving a Queen's Award for Export.

The present Bury fabrication premises was acquired in 1977 with the purchase of California Engineering Company Ltd. In 1992 the business opened an office in Singapore, followed in 2002 by an engineering support office in Chennai.

Grandson of the founder, and Group Chief Executive David Hodgkiss,  died in 2020. He was succeeded as Group Chief Executive by his sister Susan Hodgkiss,  .

Acquisitions and new businesses

Locations

William Hare Group has steel fabrication facilities at Bury, Wetherby, Scarborough, Wigan, Newport, Rotherham and in the United Arab Emirates. Coatings are applied at a Grantham site. The Derby plant manufactures cold-formed steel components and engineered timber / hybrid structures.

The Group operates sales and engineering support offices in London, Chennai, Singapore, Seoul and Porto.

A majority of the firm's staff are employed at overseas subsidiaries and branches.

Controversies

Unfair dismissal

In a 2010 judgement, William Hare was found to have unfairly dismissed an employee.

Trinity Walk
In 2008, Shepherd Construction contracted with William Hare Group to provide structural steelwork for the Trinity Walk shopping centre in Wakefield. Shepherd Construction subsequently sought, under a pay when paid clause, to withhold payment in the sum of £996,683.35. The ultimate client had gone into Administration. In 2009, Mr Justice Coulson of the Technology and Construction Court ruled against the payment being withheld. That judgement was upheld at the Court of Appeal in 2010. Shepherd Construction had used an obsolete form of words in its contract with William Hare Group.

Fatal fall

The Health and Safety Executive fined William Hare Group £75,000 plus £9,000 costs in 2003. An employee fell and died during 1998 extension works to the London Imperial War Museum. William Hare Group pleaded guilty to a breach of section 2(1) of the Health and Safety at Work Act 1974. The firm was criticised for its vague method statement, and for leaving workers to decide basic safety precautions. The unharnessed victim fell 13m from a precarious platform.

See also

References

External links

Construction and civil engineering companies of the United Kingdom
Steel companies of the United Kingdom
Structural steel
Companies established in the 19th century
1888 establishments in England
Organisations based in Bury, Greater Manchester
Privately held companies of the United Kingdom
Family-owned companies of the United Kingdom
Family-owned companies of England
Privately held companies of England